René Hansen (born 18 April 1965 in Denmark) is a Danish retired footballer.

References

Danish men's footballers
Association football midfielders
1965 births
Living people
UD Las Palmas players
Fremad Amager players